CAPL may refer to:
 Communication Access Programming Language
 Culturally Authentic Pictorial Lexicon